RBC Records is an American online independent record label and management company founded by partners Brian Shafton and Bob Grossi. It provides artists and independent labels with a full-service "virtual label" alternative to signing with a major label. RBC provides distribution, sales, marketing, online publicity, radio promotion, video promotion, product management, and creative services consulting to artists and management. The company announced in 2013 that it would start producing and distributing films under the name RBC Films.

In September 2018, BMG Rights Management acquired RBC for an undisclosed fee.

Roster
 Beeda Weeda (RBC)
 Boosie Badazz (Trill Entertainment/RBC)
 Brotha Lynch Hung (Strange Music/RBC)
 Cappadonna (RBC)
 Chief Keef (Glory Boyz Entertainment/RBC)
 C-Murder (RBC)
 E-40 (Sick Wid' It Records/RBC)
 EPMD (RBC)
 Gucci Mane (1017 Brick Squad/RBC)
 Mike Jones (Money Train/RBC)
 Keak Da Sneak (RBC)
 Krayzie Bone (BTNH Worldwide/RBC)
 Kurupt (RBC)
 Layzie Bone (Harmony Howse/BTNH/RBC)
 Lyfe Jennings
 Method Man (RBC)
 Pac Div (RBC)
 Philthy Rich (Livewire/RBC)
 Skeme (RBC)
 Tech N9ne (Strange Music/RBC)
 Webbie (Trill Entertainment/RBC)
 The Regime (Smoke-A-Lot/RBC)
 Yukmouth (Smoke-A-Lot/RBC)
 Novi Novak (VSOE/RBC)
 Lil Reese (Def Jam Records/RBC)
 Fredo Santana (Savage Squad Records/RBC)
 KSI (Beerus Ltd/RBC)
S-X (RBC)

Discography

2007
 Spider Loc – The West Kept Secret: The Prequel (2007)

2008
 Krayzie Bone – The Fixtape Vol. 1: Smoke on This (2008)

2009
 Krayzie Bone – The Fixtape Vol. 2: Just One Mo Hit (2009)

2010
 Krayzie Bone – The Fixtape Vol. 3: Lyrical Paraphernalia (2010)
 Yukmouth – Free at Last (2010)

2011
 Webbie – Savage Life 3 (2011)
 Layzie Bone – The Definition (2011)
 Layzie Bone – The Meaning (2011)
 Pac Div – The DiV (2011)
 Krayzie Bone – The Fixtape Vol. 4: Under the Influence (2011)

2012
 Pac Div – GMB (2012)
 Cashis - "The Art of Dying" (2012)
 Keak Da Sneak – Cheddar Cheese I Say (2012)
 Skeme - Alive & Living (2012)

2013
 Krayzie Bone – Quick Fix: Less Drama. More Music. (Level 1) (2013)
 Tech N9ne - Something Else (2013)
 Yukmouth & The Regime – Dragon Gang''' (2013)
 Philthy Rich – N.E.R.N.L. 2 (2013)
 Webbie – Savage Life 4 (2013)
 Cappadonna - Eyrth, Wynd and Fyre (2013)

2014
 Lil Mouse - Michael Mouse Myers (2014)
 Novi Novak - One Size Fits All (2014) 

 2015 

 Krayzie Bone - Chasing The Devil (2015)

2017
 Chief Keef - Two Zero One Seven (2017)
 Chief Keef - Thot Breaker (2017)

2020
KSI - Dissimulation (2020)

2021
KSI - All Over The Place'' (2021)

References

External links
 Official site for RBC Records

American independent record labels
Record labels established in 2001
Hip hop record labels
Gangsta rap record labels
2001 establishments in the United States